Covenant Evangelical Free Church (CEFC) is a church in Singapore. It has three worship centres – one at Jelapang Road in Bukit Panjang, one at Woodlands Drive 16 in Woodlands and one at Suntec Convention Centre, Level 3.

Senior Leaders and Pastors
 Chairman - Elder Dr Louis Tan
 Reverend Edmund Chan - Leadership Mentor
 Reverend Tony Yeo - Senior Pastor
 Reverend Tan Kay Kiong - Senior Pastor

History of CEFC
Covenant Evangelical Free Church started in 1978 as a church plant named Emmanuel Christian Fellowship (ECF) with 17 pioneer members.

Derivation of church name 
 Covenant: The Covenant points to God's unfailing promise of salvation and blessing for mankind, fulfilled in Christ. 
 Evangelical: This reflects CEFC's commitment to the gospel and to the preaching of the same for salvation. An evangelical agrees to the virgin birth, the resurrection of Christ and justification by faith, and is devoted to the inspired Word of God.
 Free: Each congregation of the Evangelical Free Church denomination has a right, under God, to govern its own affairs.
 Church: CEFC is a community of believers united in Christ by His Spirit.

Aim
To return the Church to its disciplemaking roots through authentic discipleship and intentional disciplemaking so as to reproduce disciples of a certain kind and to multiply them to win the world for Christ.

IDMC Conferences
CEFC hosts the annual IDMC Conference which ministers to pastors and lay leaders from churches in Singapore and overseas.

References

External links
 Covenant Evangelical Free Church website

1978 establishments in Singapore
Churches in Singapore